Medical Center station may refer to:

Baylor University Medical Center station, a light rail station in Dallas, Texas
Illinois Medical District station, which was known as Medical Center prior to June 25, 2006
LA County+USC Medical Center station, a busway station in Boyle Heights, California
Medical Center station (MARTA), a metro station in Sandy Springs, Georgia
Medical Center station (Washington Metro), a rapid transit station in Bethesda, Maryland
Medical/Market Center station, a commuter rail station in Dallas, Texas
Tufts Medical Center station, a subway and bus rapid transit station in Boston, Massachusetts
University Medical Center station, a light rail station in Salt Lake City, Utah
VA Medical Center station (DART), a light rail station in Dallas, Texas
VA Medical Center station, a former light rail stop on the Green Line E branch in Boston, Massachusetts
VA Medical Center station (Metro Transit), a light rail station in Minneapolis, Minnesota

See also
Medical Center (disambiguation)